The Nathaniel Halderman House is a historic house located at 728 East Washington Street in Mount Carroll, Illinois. The house was built in 1854 for Nathaniel Halderman, an early settler of Carroll County. Halderman came to the county in 1841; he partnered with other early settlers to plat Mount Carroll and build the town's first mill. He also served as the city's first mayor and was later Carroll County's treasurer. Jacob Emmert, one of Halderman's business partners, built the Italianate house using brick from the city's brickyard. The house's design features an open porch along the front, a cornice with paired brackets, and a cupola atop the roof.

The house was added to the National Register of Historic Places on November 24, 1980.

References

Houses on the National Register of Historic Places in Illinois
Italianate architecture in Illinois
Houses completed in 1854
Houses in Carroll County, Illinois
National Register of Historic Places in Carroll County, Illinois